Lophocampa atrimaculata is a moth of the family Erebidae. It was described by George Hampson in 1901. It is found in Costa Rica, Brazil, Bolivia and Peru.

Description
In 1901 Hampson wrote in his description of Halisidota atrimaculata:

References

 
Lophocampa atrimaculata at BOLD Systems
Lophocampa atrimaculata at Encyclopedia of Life
Halisidota atrimaculata at BHL

atrimaculata
Moths described in 1901